Flamingo is a member of the adhesion-GPCR family of proteins. Flamingo has sequence homology to cadherins and G protein-coupled receptors (GPCR). Flamingo was originally identified as a Drosophila protein involved in planar cell polarity. Mammals have three flamingo homologs, CELSR1, CELSR2, CELSR3. In mice all three have distinct expression patterns in the brain.

Adhesion G protein coupled receptors
The adhesion-GPCR family has over thirty members in the human genome. The adhesion GPCRs are seven transmembrane helix proteins that have long N-terminal domains. For example, flamingo has EGF-like, Laminin G-like and Cadherin-like sequences in its N-terminal extracellular domain.

Axon fascicles
Mice that lack CELSR3 have altered bundling of axons to form fascicles.

Function in dendrite morphology

In Drosophila, flamingo mutants were found to have abnormal dendrite branching, outgrowth and routing. Kimura et al. proposed that flamingo regulates dendrite branch elongation and prevents the dendritic trees of adjacent Drosophila sensory neurons from having overlap of dendritic arbors.

A study of mammalian flamingo homolog CELSR2 found that it is involved in the regulation of dendrite growth. RNAi was used to alter CELSR2 expression in cortical and cerebral brain slice cultures. The dendrites of pyramidal neurons in cortical cultures and Purkinje neurons in cerebellar cultures were simplified when CELSR2 expression was reduced.

Vertebrate planar cell polarity
CELSR1 was shown to be required for the normal polarized position of kinocilia to one side of  hair cells of the mouse inner ear.

References

Adhesion G protein-coupled receptors
G protein-coupled receptors